Eskilstuna Airport is an airport in Eskilstuna, Sweden. It is located 13 km east of Eskilstuna and 97 km away from Stockholm.

References

Airports in Sweden